There are two rivers named Guareí River in Brazil:

 Guareí River (Mato Grosso do Sul)
 Guareí River (São Paulo)

See also
 Guareí, a municipality in São Paulo, Brazil
 Guara River (Parana)